Celestin Mpoua Nkoua (born 12 November 1957) is a Congolese handball coach of the DR Congo national team.

References

1957 births
Living people
Handball coaches of international teams
21st-century Democratic Republic of the Congo people